Nikolay Davydenko was the defending champion, but lost in the first round to Robert Farah.
Philipp Kohlschreiber won the title defeating Marin Čilić 7–6(10–8), 6–3 in the final.

Seeds
The top four seeds receive a bye into the second round.

Draw

Finals

Top half

Bottom half

Qualifying

Seeds

Qualifiers

Draw

First qualifier

Second qualifier

Third qualifier

Fourth qualifier

References
 Main Draw
 Qualifying Draw

BMW Open - Singles
2012 BMW Open